Homington and Coombe Bissett Downs is a 25.0 hectare biological Site of Special Scientific Interest in Wiltshire, notified in 1971.

Coombe Bissett Downs is managed as a nature reserve by Wiltshire Wildlife Trust.

Sources

 Natural England citation sheet for the site (accessed 1 April 2022)

External links
 Coombe Bissett Downs - Wiltshire Wildlife Trust
 Natural England website (SSSI information)

Sites of Special Scientific Interest in Wiltshire
Sites of Special Scientific Interest notified in 1971
Wiltshire Wildlife Trust reserves